William Irwin (1827 – March 15, 1886) was an American politician from the Democratic Party who served as the 13th governor of California between 1875 and 1880. He previously served as acting lieutenant governor for nine months in 1875.

Born in Butler County, Ohio, Irwin graduated in 1848 from Marietta College in Marietta, where he later became an instructor. After moving to California, Irwin worked in various private industries and was eventually elected to the California State Assembly as one of two members representing Siskiyou County. He became the editor of a newspaper and then was elected to the California State Senate. He served as president pro tempore of the Senate and as such, became acting lieutenant governor in 1875 when Lieutenant Governor Romualdo Pacheco became governor. Irwin was elected governor in his own right that same year. He died in 1886 in San Francisco, California and was interred in the Sacramento Historic City Cemetery in Sacramento, California.

References

External links 
 William Irwin at the California State Library

1827 births
1886 deaths
Democratic Party governors of California
Lieutenant Governors of California
Democratic Party California state senators
Democratic Party members of the California State Assembly
Marietta College alumni
People from Siskiyou County, California
People from Butler County, Ohio
19th-century American politicians